M Oriental Bank, previously known as Oriental Commercial Bank Limited, is a commercial bank in Kenya, the largest economy in the East African Community. It is licensed by the Central Bank of Kenya, the central bank and national banking regulator.

Overview
, the bank's total assets were valued at KSh10.577 billion (approx. US$106 million), with KSh3.028 billion (approx. US$30.3 million), in shareholders' funds. In June 2016, the bank announced a change in business strategy. MOB will cease to operate as a retail bank and instead become a private bank, with focus on serving family-owned businesses and high net-worth individuals. The use of ATMs would also be phased out.

Ownership
In 2016, Oriental Commercial Bank was officially re-branded to M Oriental Bank Limited, after the Central Bank of Kenya gave approval to M Holdings Limited to acquire majority shares. M Holdings Limited, a Kenyan owned and registered company subsequently opted to acquire only 33.8 percent. As of 31 December 2017, the shareholding in the stock of the bank was as illustrated in the table below.

Branch network
The bank maintains a network of branches at the following locations:

 Westlands Branch – Apollo Centre, 2nd Floor, Ring Road, Westlands, Nairobi
 Koinange Street Branch – Finance House, Ground Floor, Koinange Street, Nairobi
 Sameer Business Park – Sameer Business Park, Mombasa Road, Nairobi
 Mombasa Branch – HassanAli Building, Nkurumah Road, Mombasa
 Nakuru Branch – AFC Building, Kijabe Row, Nakuru
 Eldoret Branch – Muya House, Kenyatta Street, Eldoret
 Kitale Branch – Robert Ouko Road, Kitale.

Governance
The bank is governed by a six-person board of directors. Shanti Shah, one of the non-executive directors, serves as the chairman. The chief executive officer is Alakh Kohli.

See also
 List of banks in Kenya
 Economy of Kenya

References

External links
  Website of M Oriental Bank
 Website of Central Bank of Kenya
  Dar Owners In KSh1.3 Billion Oriental Deal

Banks of Kenya
Companies based in Nairobi
Banks established in 2002
2002 establishments in Kenya